The Pindad Komodo or Pindad Dragon for export markets is a 4x4 light armored car developed and produced by Pindad. The vehicle was developed after Indonesian president Susilo Bambang Yudhoyono made a visit to Pindad's main office and asked them to create an indigenous tactical vehicle in order to serve the needs of the Indonesian police and military as an alternative to other 4x4 tactical vehicles such as the Humvee as a personal challenge to the company. The vehicle was given its present name by President Yudhoyono after it was unveiled to the public at the 2012 Indo Defence Expo and Forum in Jakarta, Indonesia so that the Komodo can have a strong impression "at any combat field and could bring the glory for Indonesia.", especially since the Komodo dragon is an endemic animal native to Indonesia.

Its design features are made similar to the Renault Sherpa Light Scout family, which is also used by Indonesia. The Komodo's external designs also resembles the Humvee.

The Komodo tactical vehicles are slowly being adopted into Indonesian police and military service, which started after the vehicles made its public debut at Indodefence 2012. Production of these vehicles are seen to be a major shift by Pindad to move into the protected mobility domain in a cost-effective manner by the government by producing the Komodo on Indonesian soil.

History
The creation of the Komodo first started on October 26, 2011, when President Yudhoyono personally visited a PT Indonesian Aerospace weapon system exhibition. During his visit, he gave a challenge to Pindad's Product Development Team to make an indigenous 4×4 tactical vehicle. Pindad's Special Vehicle Division technicians bore the responsibility to make the said vehicle. In the course of developing the vehicle, Pindad looked at other armored tactical vehicles that were being produced and sold such as the Armored Multi-Purpose Vehicle, the Nexter Aravis and the Sherpa Light family. During the visit, PT Pindad president Adik Aviantono Sudarsono was told to prepare on the production process of the vehicle when President Yudhoyono requested Pindad to have a working prototype ready in two months after his visit. Production of the Komodo was based at Pindad's factory in Bandung, West Java. The creation of a working Komodo prototype was completed in March 2012.

The Komodo made its first appearance when Pindad demonstrated the tactical vehicle to several visitors at the RITech Expo in September 2012, showing the Komodo alongside the Anoa and other Pindad-made small arms to the public. Production on a working Komodo by Pindad started on October 5, 2012. On November 10, 2012, President Yudhoyono gave the name Komodo to Pindad's new tactical vehicle at the Indo Defence 2012 Expo & Forum, Jakarta International Expo, Kemayoran, Jakarta. He was asked to give the tactical vehicle a name as a formality when he was a guest in Indodefence 2012. The naming of the vehicle was because the Komodo dragon symbolises Indonesia as a whole. President Yudhoyono was accompanied during the naming ceremony by various officials including Defence Minister Purnomo Yusgiantoro, Deputy Defence Minister Sjafrie, Police Chief General Timur Pradopo, Armed Forces Commander Admiral Agus Suhartono, Vice Governor of Jakarta Tjahaja Basuki Purnama and other high-ranking officials. A production plan of at least 240 Komodo tactical vehicles was planned after it was unveiled in Indodefence 2012.

The Komodo was also unveiled to visitors who were from the Royal College of Defence Studies when they visited Pindad manufacturing facilities during official visits. The vehicle was presented to Indonesian and Singaporean military personnel at the Weaponry System Display and Practice Assistance Latma Safkar Indopura 24/2012 from November 21 to 28, 2012. The Komodo was shown to the public at the 2013 Indonesian National Armed Force Leadership Meeting exhibition at Cilangkap.

Pindad has been awarded at the BUMN Award 2013 by the Indonesian government for their contribution in making the Komodo, since 80% of its components are being made locally. Pindad has reported confirmation that there are unnamed countries that are very interested to purchase Komodo tactical vehicles. Pindad has said that possible exports can be done for ASEAN member nations who wish to buy the Komodos. Defence Minister Purnomo Yusgiantoro, from Merdeka Palace, said that the production of the Komodo is a stepping stone that would eventually lead to the development of a tactical vehicle industry in Indonesia.

Pindad obtained a loan of 300–700 million Rupiah from the State Capital Participation or Penyertaan Modal Negara to assist in covering the costs of producing the Komodos. The company has been given a deadline of 10 years by the government to repay the loan made from PMN funds. Pindad said that they would be able to repay the loan as soon as possible.

Design
The establishment of Law Number 16/2012 allowed Pindad to create the Komodo to their advantage, in which the law stipulates Indonesia to have local content used in the manufacturing of its defence products with international cooperation. The Komodo was designed in Pindad's Bandung, West Java manufacturing facility with a price tag of about US$300,000. According to Pindad, the Komodo's monocoque armored body is bulletproof and it can withstand 7.62 mm or lower calibre rifle and handgun bullets. The Komodo's glass is also made bulletproof. The Komodo's turbo intercooler diesel engine has a total horsepower of 215 PS at 2500 rpm, allowing the vehicle to achieve the weight ratio of around 30 hp/ton.

The Komodo can carry up to 200 liters of diesel fuel. The vehicle only has a manual transmission system, which consists of 6 forward and 1 reverse gear, allowing the Komodo to have off-road capabilities. President Avianto said that the normal cruising range of the Komodo is at 450 kilometers, with an average speed of 70 km/h. The Komodo's off-road capabilities have been tested in various conditions ranging from mountainous terrain to mud and sand.

While most parts of the Komodo are made locally in Indonesia such as the frame, body and design, Pindad has publicly stated that they used imported components such as Hino for machinery parts and Michelin for the tires. Its diesel engines were imported directly from Renault.

The Komodo's monocoque steel body was made locally by Krakatau Steel. The Indonesian Army's Research and Development Department or Dislitbang TNI AD has officially certified the Komodo as a road worthy vehicle after Pindad conducted static and dynamic tests.

Pindad collaborated with MBDA to create the mobile anti-aircraft SAM variant, which are armed with Mistral SAM missiles. According to the Indonesian military, a total of 56 mobile SAM units are to be made and purchased. Pindad also collaborated with Nexter to create Komodos that would serves as mobile command and communications vehicles with a total of 51 units being ordered. The Komodos can be modified by Pindad on the request of their customers in order to suit their own requirements, depending on the circumstances.

In Indo Defence 2016, Saab has entered into an agreement with Pindad to work on a Komodo anti-aircraft variant that will use the RBS 70 NG missile system and Giraffe 1X AESA radar.

On June 1, 2018, Pindad announced that it has entered into a partnership with Bhukhanvala Industries to research and develop a ceramic-based protection system for the Komodo. From the certification carried out by the Ministry of Industry and PT Surveyor Indonesia, it is known that Komodo has a TKDN (Tingkat Komponen Dalam Negeri — Domestic Component Level) of 40.86 to 40.91%.

Operational history
A total of 14 units of Komodo have been handed over by Pindad since last June 2018 and departed for Democratic Republic of the Congo in November with 850 soldiers who served in MONUSCO. The Komodo that were handed over by Pindad consisted of 12 troop transport (APC) variants, 1 Command version, and 1 Ambulance unit.

Variants

Variants of the Komodo are offered by Pindad with the following being officially marketed to its customers:

 Ambulance
 Armoured personnel carrier / APC
 Battering ram
 Command and Communications
 Cannon Towing
 Mobile SAM launcher Mistral
 Recon
 Mortar: A mortar variant was in testing stages as of November 2018. 
 25/30mm autocannon: A turreted variant with 25/30 mm autocannon is demonstrated in Indo Defence 2018, using Cockerill CPWS Generation 2 turret and equipped with 2 slots for ATGM.

Users

Current
 : The following are equipped/scheduled to be equipped with the Komodo:
 The Indonesian Army has officially ordered 6 Komodos. The Mistral Mobile SAM launcher variant is also scheduled for orders with the Indonesian Army with a total of 56 Komodos, scheduled to be fully delivered by 2015. An additional fifty Komodos are ordered from Pindad. 8 Komodos modified to house communications equipments were also ordered. In 2019, another 51 Komodos were ordered by the army.
 Kopassus has ordered an unknown number of Komodos modified for anti-terrorist missions, which includes the capability of ramming into brick walls measuring up to 30 centimetres. These will be used by SAT-81 Gultor in anti-terrorist operations. Tender Indonesia has publicly reported that an additional 10 Komodos were ordered for the same variant. In addition, they are equipped with electronic and communications equipment with tactical ladders as well as other special operations equipment.
 The Mobile Brigade has ordered 2 Komodo APCs. These are to be customised for "Jungle Warfare" operations, which includes missions in urban and jungle areas. The Mobile Brigade has placed an additional order of 10 Komodos. They will have metal grilles installed on all windows due to their involvement in BRIMOB operations, which includes the suppression of violent demonstrations and riots.

Potential
 : On February 2022, Nicaraguan President Daniel Ortega was announced Nicaragua is interested in potentially purchasing Pindad Komodo/Dragon armored cars.
 : On February 29, 2020, it was announced that the Philippines is interested in potentially purchasing Komodos.

See also
 Renault Sherpa Light Scout family

References

External links
 Komodo recon specifications at Pindad's website

Post–Cold War military equipment of Indonesia
All-wheel-drive vehicles
Military trucks
Off-road vehicles
Military vehicles introduced in the 2010s
Military light utility vehicles
Armoured cars
Military vehicles of Indonesia